Onslow is a masculine given name and nickname which may refer to:

 Onslow Humphreys (c. 1893-?), Australian rugby union player
 Onslow Stearns (1810-1878), American railroad builder and politician
 Onslow Stevens (1902-1977), American actor
 Onlsow Whiting (1872-1937), English sculptor
 Onslow (Keeping Up Appearances), British TV character

English-language masculine given names